is a masculine Japanese given name.

Possible writings
Ken'ichi can be written using different kanji characters and can mean:
賢一, "wise, one"
健一, "healthy, one"
憲一, "constitution, one"
謙一, "humble, one"
建一, "build, one"
研一, "polish, one"
兼一, "concurrently, one"
The name can also be written in hiragana or katakana.

People with the name 
, Japanese World War II flying ace
Ken'ichi Chen (建一, born 1956), Chinese-Japanese chef 
Kenichi Ego (賢一, born 1979), Japanese football player
Kenichi Endō (憲一, born 1961), Japanese actor
Kenichi Enomoto (健一, 1904–1970), Japanese singing comedian
Kenichi Fukui (謙一, 1918–1998), Japanese chemist
, Japanese ice hockey player
Ken'ichi Kasai (ケンイチ, born 1970), Japanese anime director
Keni'chi Kōbō (賢一, born 1973), former sumo wrestler
Kenichi Konishi (健一, born 1909), Japanese field hockey player
Kenichi Hagiwara (健一, born 1950), Japanese actor and lead singer
Kenichi Horie (謙一, born 1938), Japanese solo yachtsman
Kenichi Kaga (健一, born 1983), Japanese footballer for Júbilo Iwata
, Japanese architect
, Japanese rugby union player
, Japanese field hockey player
Kenichi Kuboya (健一, born 1972), Japanese golfer
Kenichi Matsuyama (ケンイチ, born 1985), Japanese actor
Kenichi Mikawa (憲一, born 1946), Japanese singer
, Japanese philosopher
Kenichi Mizuno (賢一, born 1966), Japanese politician
Kenichi Momoyama (虔一, 1909–1990), first son of Prince Ui of Korea by Lady Jeong
Kenichi Mori (賢一, born 1984), Japanese footballer for Mito HollyHock
Kenichi Nishi (健一, born 1967), Japanese video game designer
Kenichi Ogata (voice actor) (賢一, born 1942), Japanese voice actor
Kenichi Ogawa (堅一, born 1988), Japanese boxer
Kenichi Ono (健一, born 1958), Japanese voice actor and actor
Kenichi Ohmae (研一, born 1943), Japanese business and corporate strategist
Kenichi Okada (健一, born 1980), rhythm guitarist of Japanese band MERRY (previously CRESCENT and Syndrome)
, Japanese handball player
Kenichi Shimokawa (健一, born 1970), Japanese football goalkeeper
Kenichi Shinoda (建市, born 1942), Japanese yakuza boss of Yamaguchi-gumi
Kenichi Suzumura (健一, born 1974), Japanese voice actor
Kenichi Sonoda (健一, born 1962), manga artist and anime character designer
Kenichi Suzuki (disambiguation), multiple people
Kenichi Tago (健一, born 1989), Japanese professional badminton player
Kenichi Takahashi (健一, born 1973), Japanese long-distance runner
Ken-ichi Ueda (植田 憲一, 1946), Japanese scientist
Kenichi Uemura (健一, born 1974), Japanese football player
, Japanese fencer
, Japanese golfer
Kenichi Yamakawa (健一, born 1953), Japanese author and rock musician
Kenichi Yamamoto (yakuza) (健一, 1925–1982), founder of the Yamaken-gumi yakuza gang
Ken'ichi Yoshida (literary scholar) (健一, 1912–1977), Japanese author and literary critic
Kenichi Yoshida (animator) (健一, born 1969), Japanese animator and character designer
Kenichi Yumoto (健一, born 1984), Japanese freestyle wrestler

Fictional characters 

Kenichi (ケンイチ), the main character of the 2001 anime film Metropolis
Kenichi Shirahama (兼一), the main character of the manga series Kenichi: The Mightiest Disciple
Kenichi Mitsuba (三葉ケン一), a character from Ninja Hattori-kun franchise.

See also
Chief Detective Kenichi, a manga series by Osamu Tezuka
Kenichi Yamamoto (disambiguation)

Japanese masculine given names